Andrew Kellaway may refer to:
 Andrew Kellaway (Australian rules footballer)
 Andrew Kellaway (rugby union)